Wacław Hamerliński (born 26 August 1936) is a Polish former sports shooter. He competed in the 25 metre pistol event at the 1968 Summer Olympics.

References

1936 births
Living people
Polish male sport shooters
Olympic shooters of Poland
Shooters at the 1968 Summer Olympics
People from Mogilno County
Sportspeople from Kuyavian-Pomeranian Voivodeship